Frederick Weber (1 December 1905 – 17 February 1994) was an American épée fencer and modern pentathlete. He competed at the 1936 Summer Olympics.

References

External links
 

1905 births
1994 deaths
Sportspeople from Kalamazoo, Michigan
American male épée fencers
American male modern pentathletes
Olympic fencers of the United States
Olympic modern pentathletes of the United States
Fencers at the 1936 Summer Olympics
Modern pentathletes at the 1936 Summer Olympics
Pan American Games gold medalists for the United States
Pan American Games silver medalists for the United States
Pan American Games medalists in fencing
Fencers at the 1951 Pan American Games
20th-century American people